Iron(III) fluoride, also known as ferric fluoride, are inorganic compounds with the formula FeF3(H2O)x where x = 0 or 3. They are mainly of interest by researchers, unlike the related iron(III) chlorides. Anhydrous iron(III) fluoride is white, whereas the hydrated forms are light pink.

Chemical and physical properties
Iron(III) fluoride is a thermally robust, antiferromagnetic solid consisting of high spin Fe(III) centers, which is consistent with the pale colors of all forms of this material. Both anhydrous iron(III) fluoride as well as its hydrates are hygroscopic.

Structure
The anhydrous form adopts a simple structure with octahedral Fe(III)F6 centres interconnected by linear Fe-F-Fe linkages. In the language of crystallography, the crystals are classified as rhombohedral with an R-3c space group. The structural motif is similar to that seen in ReO3. Although the solid is nonvolatile, it evaporates at high temperatures, the gas at 987  °C consists of FeF3, a planar molecule of D3h symmetry with three equal Fe-F bonds, each of length 176.3 pm. At very high temperatures, it decomposes to give FeF2 and F2.

Two crystalline forms—or more technically, polymorphs—of FeF3·3H2O are known, the α and β forms. These are prepared by evaporation of an HF solution containing Fe3+ at room temperature (α form) and above 50 °C (β form). The space group of the β form is P4/m, and the α form maintains a P4/m space group with a J6 substructure. The solid α form is unstable and converts to the β form within days.  The two forms are distinguished by their difference in quadrupole splitting from their Mössbauer spectra.

Preparation, occurrence, reactions
Anhydrous iron(III) fluoride is prepared by treating virtually any anhydrous iron compound with fluorine. More practically and like most metal fluorides, it is prepared by treating the corresponding chloride with hydrogen fluoride:
FeCl3 + 3 HF → FeF3 + 3 HCl

It also forms as a passivating film upon contact between iron (and steel) and hydrogen fluoride. The hydrates crystallize from aqueous hydrofluoric acid.

The material is a fluoride acceptor. With xenon hexafluoride it forms [FeF4][XeF5].

Pure FeF3 is not yet known among minerals. However, hydrated form is known as the very rare fumarolic mineral topsøeite. Generally a trihydrate, its chemistry is slightly more complex: FeF[F0.5(H2O)0.5]4·H2O.

Applications
The primary commercial use of iron(III) fluoride in the production of ceramics.

Some cross coupling reaction are catalyzed by ferric fluoride-based compounds. Specifically the coupling of biaryl compounds are catalyzed by hydrated iron(II) fluoride complexes of N-heterocyclic carbene ligands. Other metal fluorides also catalyse similar reactions. Iron(III) fluoride has also been shown to catalyze chemoselective addition of cyanide to aldehydes to give the cyanohydrins.

Safety
The anhydrous material is a powerful dehydrating agent. The formation of ferric fluoride may have been responsible for the explosion of a cylinder of hydrogen fluoride gas.

References

External links

National Pollutant Inventory—Fluoride and compounds fact sheet
CAMEO Chemicals: Database of Hazardous Materials

Fluorides
Metal halides
Iron(III) compounds